Altica torquata, the steel-blue grapevine flea beetle, is a species of flea beetle in the family Chrysomelidae. It is found in Central America, North America, and Oceania.

References

Further reading

 
 

Alticini
Articles created by Qbugbot
Beetles described in 1858
Taxa named by John Lawrence LeConte